Badacsony wine region is located in central Transdanubia, on the Northern shores of Lake Balaton, around mount Badacsony. Its area is approximately 1600 hectares.

History
Grapes were already cultivated in the area during the Roman empire, emperor Probus introduced large plantations. In the Middle Ages the plantations were mainly owned by the church. The wine "badacsonyi ürmös" had a fame that equaled that of the Tokaji Aszu in the 18th and 19th centuries. The phylloxera plague at the end of the 19th century caused significant damage to this wine region as well and following the plague vineyards were modernized in order to avoid erosion of the soil. At the same time new varieties were also introduced to the area.

Climate and geography
The soil is a mixture of clay, loess, and sand on top of basalt. The climate is mild, tempered with relatively high air humidity. Due to the proximity of Lake Balaton the Southern slopes receive the sun light reflected from the lake's surface. The reflection of the sunshine makes that the micro-climate is ideal for grape cultivation.

The following villages belong to the wine region: Ábrahámhegy, Badacsonytomaj, Badacsonytördemic, Balatonrendes, Balatonszepezd, Gyulakeszi, Hegymagas, Káptalantóti, Kisapáti, Kővágóörs, Nemesgulács, Raposka, Révfülöp, Salföld, Szigliget, Tapolca.

Grapes and wines
Szürkebarát is one of the best known varieties cultivated in the Badacsony wine region. Szürkebarát is a descendant of Pinot gris, brought to Hungary from France by monks around 1300. The special soil conditions and the microclimate of the Badacsony wine region made that Szürkebarát differs from  Pinot gris. In certain years it develops noble rot. Olaszrizling is most widespread variety cultivated in the region. Under favorable conditions the grapes are left on the vine stock late in the Fall, and the resulting wine is sold as "szemelt rizling" (literally, selected riesling). Other grapes include Tramini, Ottonel muskotály, Rajnai rizling and Chardonnay. Kéknyelű is used to be the dominant grape variety of the region, but the plantations were severely damaged by frost in the 1980s, and its significance decreased. It has seen a rise of popularity lately, and is expected to become a characteristic variety of the Badacsony region in the near future.

The wines from the Badacsony region own a special character, they tend to be full bodied, and have a rich taste. Traditional, oak barrel based wine production dominates in the region. The use of reductive techniques is spreading, but the modern techniques have not yet changed the typical character of the wines from the region.

References

External links 
 Wine regions of Hungary
 Laposa.hu 
 http://www.killer-wines.com/

Wine regions of Hungary